Peregrinatio means leaving one's homeland and wandering for the love of God. It can refer to:

the Peregrinatio ad Petri Sedem, a papal institution for assistance to pilgrims to Rome and certain other pious sites and events

It occurs as or in the title of several notable texts:
a Peregrinatio describing the liturgy practised at Jerusalem, dating probably from the 4th century
Peregrinatio in terram sanctam, an incunabulum by the Dutch author Erhard Reuwich
Peregrinatio Etheriae or Peregrinatio Silviae, another account of a pilgrimage to the Holy Land by Egeria (pilgrim)
Peregrinatio Scholastica, or Learning's Pilgrimage, written by the English dramatist John Day (dramatist)